Five ships of the Royal Navy have borne the name HMS Fantome, after the French word Fantôme, meaning 'ghost':

 was a 16-gun  launched in 1839 and sold in 1864.
 was a composite  screw sloop launched in 1873 and sold in 1889.
 was a  sloop launched in 1901.  She was used as a survey ship from 1906 and was sold in 1925.
 was an  launched in 1942 and scrapped in 1947.

Royal Navy ship names